Alexander Bottini (7 May 1969 – 8 May 2002) was a Venezuelan footballer. He played in two matches for the Venezuela national football team from 1991 to 1993. He was also part of Venezuela's squad for the 1991 Copa América tournament.

References

External links
 

1969 births
2002 deaths
Venezuelan footballers
Venezuela international footballers
Place of birth missing
Association football forwards